The Embassy of Germany in Ottawa is located on Waverley Street, off Queen Elizabeth Driveway, in the Golden Triangle neighbourhood of the Canadian capital of Ottawa. The official residence of the Ambassador is in Rockcliffe Park. The current Ambassador to Canada from Germany is Sabine Sparwasser.

List of Ambassadors of West Germany 
 1950–1951: Werner Dankwort (as Consul General)
 1951–1956: Werner Dankwort
 1956–1958: Hasso von Etzdorf
 1958–1963: Herbert Siegfried
 1963–1967: Kurt Oppler
 1968–1970: Joachim Friedrich Ritter
 1970–1972: Dietrich Freiherr von Mirbach
 1972–1975: Rupprecht von Keller
 1975–1979: Max Graf Podewils
 1979–1983: Erich Straetling
 1983–1990: Wolfgang Behrends

List of Ambassadors of East Germany
 1988-1990: Heinz Birch

List of Ambassadors of Germany 
 1991–1993: Richard Ellerkmann
 1993–1998: Hans-Günter Sulimma
 1999–2001: Jürgen Pöhlmann
 2001–2005: Christian Friedemann Pauls
 2006–2009: Matthias Höpfner
 2009-2012: Georg Witschel
 2012-2017: Werner Wnendt
 since 2017: Sabine Sparwasser

References

External links 

 Official site
 Facebook

Germany
Ottawa
Canada–Germany relations